Tomoxia flavicans is a species of beetle in the genus Tomoxia of the family Mordellidae. It was described by Frederick George Waterhouse in 1878.

References

Beetles described in 1878
Tomoxia